The Perth Indoor Tennis Tournament was a men's tennis tournament played in Perth, Western Australia from 1975-1977.  The event was part of the Grand Prix tennis circuit and was played on indoor hard courts.

Finals

Singles

Doubles

References
 ATP World Tour archive

Defunct tennis tournaments in Australia
Grand Prix tennis circuit
Indoor tennis tournaments
Sport in Perth, Western Australia
1975 establishments in Australia
1977 disestablishments in Australia